The 2011 Popular Consultation in Ecuador was a referendum held on May 7, 2011. President of the Republic of Ecuador Rafael Correa decreed that the 10 questions were approved based on an exit poll on Saturday, May 7. The final results were known on Thursday May 19, 2011: all the proposed changes were approved.

Proposals

The ten proposals put to the vote of the Ecuadorian people were all accepted. These proposals included, amongst others:

tougher conditions in preventive prison;
a limitation of banking operations by financial services companies;
a ban on media companies owning non-media companies;
a restructuring of the judicial system under the supervision of members of the executive and the parliamentary majority;
a ban on casinos and gambling;
a ban on bullfighting and cockfighting (canton-by-canton decision);
the creation of an administrative entity intended to regulate publications in the media.

Results

|-
!style="background-color:#E9E9E9;text-align:left;vertical-align:top;" width=500 rowspan="2"|Question
!style="background-color:#E9E9E9;text-align:center;" colspan="2"|Yes
!style="background-color:#E9E9E9;text-align:center;" colspan="2"|No
!style="background-color:#E9E9E9;text-align:center;" colspan="2"|Blank
!style="background-color:#E9E9E9;text-align:center;" colspan="2"|Invalid
|-
! style="background-color:#E9E9E9;text-align:center;" |Votes
! style="background-color:#E9E9E9;text-align:center;" |Percent
! style="background-color:#E9E9E9;text-align:center;" |Votes
! style="background-color:#E9E9E9;text-align:center;" |Percent
! style="background-color:#E9E9E9;text-align:center;" |Votes
! style="background-color:#E9E9E9;text-align:center;" |Percent
! style="background-color:#E9E9E9;text-align:center;" |Votes
! style="background-color:#E9E9E9;text-align:center;" |Percent
|-
!style="background-color:#E9E9E9;text-align:center;" colspan="9"|Referendum
|-
| style="text-align:left;vertical-align:top;" |Question 1
| style="vertical-align:top;" |4,357,105
| style="vertical-align:top;" |56.49
| style="vertical-align:top;" |3,356,545
| style="vertical-align:top;" |43.51
| style="vertical-align:top;" |462,867
| style="vertical-align:top;" |-
| style="vertical-align:top;" |457,859
| style="vertical-align:top;" |-
|-
| style="text-align:left;vertical-align:top;" |Question 2
| style="vertical-align:top;" |4,167,893
| style="vertical-align:top;" |54.17
| style="vertical-align:top;" |3,525,832
| style="vertical-align:top;" |45.83
| style="vertical-align:top;" |449,296
| style="vertical-align:top;" |-
| style="vertical-align:top;" |491,355
| style="vertical-align:top;" |-
|-
| style="text-align:left;vertical-align:top;" |Question 3
| style="vertical-align:top;" |4,074,307
| style="vertical-align:top;" |52.98
| style="vertical-align:top;" |3,616,589
| style="vertical-align:top;" |47,02
| style="vertical-align:top;" |451,226
| style="vertical-align:top;" |-
| style="vertical-align:top;" |492,254
| style="vertical-align:top;" |-
|-
| style="text-align:left;vertical-align:top;" |Question 4
| style="vertical-align:top;" |3,984,723
| style="vertical-align:top;" |52.02
| style="vertical-align:top;" |3,674,727
| style="vertical-align:top;" |47.98
| style="vertical-align:top;" |478,597
| style="vertical-align:top;" |-
| style="vertical-align:top;" |496,329
| style="vertical-align:top;" |-
|-
| style="text-align:left;vertical-align:top;" |Question 5
| style="vertical-align:top;" |4,029,458
| style="vertical-align:top;" |52.66
| style="vertical-align:top;" |3,622,646
| style="vertical-align:top;" |47.34
| style="vertical-align:top;" |505,490
| style="vertical-align:top;" |-
| style="vertical-align:top;" |476,782
| style="vertical-align:top;" |-
|-
!style="background-color:#E9E9E9;text-align:center;" colspan="9"|Popular consultation
|-
| style="text-align:left;vertical-align:top;" |Question 6
| style="vertical-align:top;" |4,023,533
| style="vertical-align:top;" |53.43
| style="vertical-align:top;" |3,507,168
| style="vertical-align:top;" |46.57
| style="vertical-align:top;" |672,650
| style="vertical-align:top;" |-
| style="vertical-align:top;" |431,025
| style="vertical-align:top;" |-
|-
| style="text-align:left;vertical-align:top;" |Question 7
| style="vertical-align:top;" |3,951,787
| style="vertical-align:top;" |52.34
| style="vertical-align:top;" |3,599,093
| style="vertical-align:top;" |47.66
| style="vertical-align:top;" |613,088
| style="vertical-align:top;" |-
| style="vertical-align:top;" |470,408
| style="vertical-align:top;" |-
|-
| style="text-align:left;vertical-align:top;" |Question 8
| style="vertical-align:top;text-align:center;" colspan="8" |only cantonal results relevant
|-
| style="text-align:left;vertical-align:top;" |Question 9
| style="vertical-align:top;" |3,882,379
| style="vertical-align:top;" |51.68
| style="vertical-align:top;" |3,630,263
| style="vertical-align:top;" |48.32
| style="vertical-align:top;" |667,397
| style="vertical-align:top;" |-
| style="vertical-align:top;" |454,337
| style="vertical-align:top;" |-
|-
| style="text-align:left;vertical-align:top;" |Question 10
| style="vertical-align:top;" |4,146,640
| style="vertical-align:top;" |55.03
| style="vertical-align:top;" |3,388,807
| style="vertical-align:top;" |44.97
| style="vertical-align:top;" |648,855
| style="vertical-align:top;" |-
| style="vertical-align:top;" |450,074
| style="vertical-align:top;" |-
|-
|Total||8,634,376||100
|-
|Registered voters/turnout||11,158,419||77.38
|-
|colspan=11|Source: National Electoral Council

In reaction Correa said "The Ecuadorean people have triumphed. [This was a victory] of this dream that is called citizen's revolution." Of the controversial media ownership amendment he said the approval was "a historic deed. We are going to diffuse the power in this country."

The chief of the Organisation of American States observer team, Enrique Correa of Chile, said that there were was no evidence of fraud and that the voting appeared to go smoothly.

References

2011 elections in South America
Referendums in Ecuador
2011 in Ecuador
2011 referendums
Gambling referendums